The 2010 World Championship of Ski Mountaineering was the first World Championship of Ski Mountaineering sanctioned by the International Ski Mountaineering Federation (ISMF), successor organization of the International Council for Ski Mountaineering Competitions (ISMC). The competition was held in the skiing area of Gran Valira in the Pyrenees, Andorra, from March 1 to March 6, 2010. This was decided by the ISMC in 2006. The event was supported by the Federació Andorrana de Muntanyisme (FAM) and the Club Pirinenc Andorrà (CPA). Andorra was also venue of the European Championship of Ski Mountaineering in 2005.

Compared to the 2008 World Championship a long distance race was not held in Andorra.

Results

Nation ranking and medals 
(all age groups)

Vertical race 
event held on March 1, 2010

List of the best 10 participants by gender (incl. "Espoirs" level):

*) incl. 30 penalty seconds

Individual 
event held on March 3, 2010

List of the best 10 participants by gender:

Team 
event held on March 5, 2010

List of the best 10 relay teams by gender (some teams included "Espoirs" level athletes):

*) incl. 1 penalty minute

Relay 
event held on March 6, 2010

List of the best 10 relay teams by gender (some teams included "Espoirs" level athletes):

Combination ranking 
(vertical race, individual and team ranking)

List of the best 10 participants by gender:

References

External links 
 Official website 

2010
World Championships of Ski Mountaineering
International sports competitions hosted by Andorra
World Championships of Ski Mountaineering
Skiing in Andorra